Salto al color is the eighth studio album by the Spanish band Amaral. The songs were composed by Eva Amaral and Juan Aguirre except "Ondas Do Mar De Vigo", which was composed by Martin Códax. Eva Amaral, who sings and plays the guitar, and Juan Aguirre, who plays acoustic, electric and Portuguese guitars, both took charge of the production. The programming was by Eva Amaral, Juan Aguirre, Amit Kewalramani and Pablo Gareta. The keyboard and piano is played by Tomás Virgós while Chris Taylor and Ricardo Esteban both play the banjo. The percussion is by Tino di Geraldo and Álex Moreno, the latter of whom also plays the drums. The album also features a string orchestra, which was recorded at Angel Recording Studios in London.

It is the third album released under the label created by the duo, Discos Antártida. It was released on 6 September 2019 and includes 13 tracks. In the week of its release, it reached number one on the Spanish albums chart.

Track listing

Charts

Weekly charts

Year-end charts

Certifications

References 

2019 albums
Amaral (band) albums
Spanish-language albums